Overlord is an anime series based on the light novel series of the same name written by Kugane Maruyama and illustrated by so-bin. The series is directed by Naoyuki Itō, written by Yukie Sugawara, and music composed by Shūji Katayama. The series aired from July 7 to September 25, 2015 on AT-X, Tokyo MX, Sun TV, KBS Kyoto, TV Aichi, and BS11.

The opening theme is "Clattanoia" by OxT, and the ending theme is "L.L.L." by Myth & Roid.


Episode list

Home media release

Japanese

English

References

Overlord episode lists
2015 Japanese television seasons